Gymnocranius is a genus of emperors native to the Indian Ocean and the western Pacific Ocean.

Species
There are currently eleven recognized species in this genus, but more species are awaiting description.
 Gymnocranius audleyi J. D. Ogilby, 1916 (Collar Seabream)
 Gymnocranius elongatus Senta, 1973 (Forktail large-eye bream)
 Gymnocranius euanus (Günther, 1879) (Japanese large-eye bream)
 Gymnocranius frenatus Bleeker, 1873 (Yellowsnout large-eye bream)
 Gymnocranius grandoculis (Valenciennes, 1830) (Robinson's Seabream)
 Gymnocranius griseus (Temminck & Schlegel, 1843) (Grey Sea bream)
 Gymnocranius microdon (Bleeker, 1851) (Blue-spotted Seabream)
 Gymnocranius obesus W. J. Chen, Miki & Borsa, 2017 (Obese large-eye bream)
 Gymnocranius oblongus Borsa, Béarez & W. J. Chen, 2010 (Oblong large-eye bream)
 Gymnocranius satoi Borsa, Béarez, Paijo & W. J. Chen, 2013 (Sato's large-eye bream)
 Gymnocranius superciliosus Borsa, Béarez, Paijo & W. J. Chen, 2013 (Eyebrowed large-eye bream)

References

Lethrinidae
Marine fish genera
Taxa named by Carl Benjamin Klunzinger